The Girls' Doubles tournament of the 2016 BWF World Junior Championships is a badminton world junior individual championships for the Eye Level Cups, held on November 8–13. The defending champion of the last edition is Chen Qingchen / Jia Yifan from China. Sayaka Hobara and Nami Matsuyama of Japan won the gold medal in this event.

Seeded

Draw

Finals

Top Half

Section 1

Section 2

Section 3

Section 4

Botom Half

Section 5

Section 6

Section 7

Section 8

References

External links
Official Pages
Main Draw

2016 BWF World Junior Championships
2016 in youth sport
Youth